Allen Crawford is an artist, illustrator, designer, and writer.

Crawford and his wife Susan founded the design and illustration studio Plankton Art Co. in 1996. Their studio's most notable project to date is the collection of 400 species identification illustrations that are on permanent display at the American Museum of Natural History’s Milstein Hall of Ocean Life in New York.

Under the pseudonym “Lord Breaulove Swells Whimsy” Crawford wrote, designed, and illustrated The Affected Provincial’s Companion, Volume One (Bloomsbury 2006), which was soon optioned for film by Johnny Depp’s production company, Infinitum Nihil. In October 2013, Metrolit Verlag in Berlin published a German edition of the book.

Crawford has appeared in The New York Times, Interview, Orion, Frieze, Vice, Tin House, and Art in America.

Crawford's latest book, Whitman Illuminated: Song of Myself (Tin House Books), an illustrated, hand-lettered, 256-page edition of Walt Whitman’s iconic poem, was released in 2014. It has won numerous awards, including Best of Show in the 3x3 Illustration Annual No.12 and a Gold Medal from the Society of Illustrators.

Bibliography
Whitman Illuminated: Song of Myself (2014)
The Affected Provincial's Companion, Vol. I (2006)

References

External links
 
Plankton Art Co.

1968 births
Living people
American illustrators